Katerina Rohonyan (born 25 April 1984) is a Ukrainian-American chess player holding the title of Woman Grandmaster (WGM).

She moved from Ukraine to United States in 2004. She regularly competes in U.S. Women's Chess Championship.

Rohonyan won the Women's Ukrainian Chess Championship in 2000 in her hometown, Mykolaiv. She competed in the Women's World Chess Championship 2008 in Nalchik, Russia, where she defeated Natalia Zhukova in the first round to progress to the second, losing to Inna Gaponenko. In 2010, she tied for the first place in the Paul Keres Memorial Tournament in Vancouver, British Columbia, Canada.

Rohonyan played for the USA team that won the bronze medal at the Women's Chess Olympiad of 2008 in Dresden. She contributed to this result by scoring 6/10 points on board four. Rohonyan also played for the gold medal-winning Ukrainian team in the European Girls' Under-18 Team Chess Championships of 2000 and 2002.

References

External links 

Katerina Rohonyan chess games at 365Chess.com

1984 births
Living people
Chess woman grandmasters
American chess players
Ukrainian chess players
Chess Olympiad competitors
Sportspeople from Mykolaiv
American people of Ukrainian descent
American people of Armenian descent
American sportswomen
Ukrainian people of Armenian descent
21st-century American women